Volodymyr Savchenko may refer to:

 Volodymyr Ivanovych Savchenko (1933–2005), Soviet-Ukrainian science fiction writer
 Volodymyr Mykolayovych Savchenko (born 1973), Ukrainian international footballer